Synapses, also known as The Beloved Stranger, is a 2019 Taiwanese film directed and written by Chang Tso-chi , starring Lü Hsueh-feng, Oscar Chiu. The film debuted at the 2019 Golden Horse Film Festival.

Plot
Many problems in the Zhang family, but one eventful summer changes many things. Zhang Junxiong is diagnosed with Alzheimer's, and his condition weighs heavily on his wife Wang Feng (Lü Hsueh-feng) and the rest of the family. His daughter-Xiao Meng is released on parole from a long prison term and struggles to reconnect with her illegitimate son Ah Chuan and her loose-cannon ex-boyfriend Ah Wen.

Cast
 Lü Hsueh-feng as Wang Feng
  Oscar Chiu as Ah Wen
 Li Meng as Xiao Meng
 Li Ying-chuan as Ah Chuan

Awards and nominations

References

External links
 

Taiwanese drama films
Chinese-language films